Raymonn Doniciansher "Goldie" Adams (born October 23, 1978) is a former gridiron football running back and return specialist who played for the Calgary Stampeders and Ottawa Renegades of the Canadian Football League. He was signed by the Stampeders in 2002 and played six regular season games for them, primarily serving as a punt and kick returner. He continued in this role with the Renegades, playing 18 games during the 2003 and 2004 seasons. He returned 43 punts and 52 kickoffs before retiring from the CFL. In 2003, he was signed by the New York Jets but was released before the start of the regular season.

References 

1978 births
Living people
American football running backs
Canadian football running backs
American football return specialists
Canadian football return specialists
Doane Tigers football players
Calgary Stampeders players
Ottawa Renegades players
New York Jets players
Players of American football from Long Beach, California
Players of Canadian football from Long Beach, California